The florin was a former coin of the Republic of Florence.

It may also refer to:

Modern currencies
 The Netherlands Antillean guilder (abbreviated ANG) is also known as a "florin", and abbreviated NAFl
 Aruban florin, the currency of Aruba
 Hungarian forint, the official currency of Hungary
 The currency sign "ƒ", called the florin sign

Obsolete currencies
 Austro-Hungarian florin, used from 1754 to 1892
 Dutch guilder, used in the Netherlands from 1680 to 2002
 East African florin, used in British East Africa from 1920 to 1921
 Lombardy-Venetia florin, used in the pre-unification Italian state of Lombardy-Veneto 1862-1866
 South German gulden, used from 1754 to 1873
 United States of Belgium florin, 1790, colloquially referred to as the "Silver Lion"

Obsolete denominations
 Florin (Aragonese coin), minted in the 14th century
 Florin (Australian coin), used from 1910 to 1966
 Florin (English coin), a rare old gold coin valued at six shillings, used only in 1344
 Florin (Irish coin), a two-shilling coin produced from 1928 to 1968
 Florin (Italian coin), the fiorino d'oro minted in Florence in 1252, from which the name "florin" derives; the first gold coin minted in significant quantities in Western Europe since the 7th century
 Florin (New Zealand coin), minted from 1933 to 1965
 Florin (British coin), British coin produced from 1849 to 1970 with its denomination inscribed variously one florin, two shillings, or with both denominations

Places
Florin, California, in Sacramento County
Florin, Pennsylvania, in Lancaster County

People
See Florin (name)

Fictional currency and places
 A currency unit in the computer games Medieval: Total War and Medieval II: Total War, set in Medieval Europe.
 One of the two main countries in William Goldman's The Princess Bride (the other is Guilder)
 The type of currency used in the video games Assassin's Creed II and Assassin's Creed Brotherhood, set in late 15th century Italy.
 The currency used in the Stardust (2007 film).
 The currency of the Republic of Cinnabar, the major political entity in David Drake's RCN Series.